Resident Evil: Vendetta, known as  in Japan, is a 2017 Japanese adult computer-animated biopunk action horror film set in the same universe as the Resident Evil video games. Produced by Marza Animation Planet and Takashi Shimizu, the film features the characters Leon S. Kennedy, Chris Redfield, and Rebecca Chambers. It is the third CG film, preceded by Resident Evil: Degeneration (2008) and Resident Evil: Damnation (2012), and also the third film installment with Leon Kennedy as a main character. It was released in Japan on May 27, 2017.

Plot
The story is set in between the events of Resident Evil 6 and Resident Evil 7: Biohazard, during 2014. BSAA agent Chris Redfield is tracking Glenn Arias, an American death merchant and a former CIA operative who is wanted by both the Interpol and FBI. Arias is on a mission of vengeance against the U.S. government for killing his friends and family in a drone strike at his wedding. Chris and his fellow agents infiltrate a mansion in Mexico, to rescue their missing undercover source, Cathy White. Inside the mansion, Chris's fellow agents are ambushed by zombies and death traps, with Chris being the sole survivor and barely making it out alive. Chris then comes face-to-face with Arias outside the mansion and is defeated by him in close quarters combat. Arias then reveals that Cathy has become a zombie under his control. As Arias leaves with his associates, Maria and Diego Gomez, the BSAA rescues Chris by slaughtering Cathy and the remaining zombie horde. Four months later, Professor Rebecca Chambers, former S.T.A.R.S. unit member and survivor of the Mansion incident, studies a new virus coined the "Animality Virus"—"A-virus" for short—that is capable of laying dormant inside any individual until the right trigger is presented. She identifies three components to the virus: the base virus, the triggering virus, and the vaccine. The research labs are attacked by Maria and releases the virus via aerosol form. While her colleagues quickly turn into zombies, Rebecca is able to formulate a vaccine to make herself immune. After fending off some zombies, Rebecca is then rescued by Chris, who briefs her on his mission.

Rebecca recognizes the zombies' loyalty to the host and makes a connection to Las Plagas, the bioweapon used by the Los Illuminados who Leon once encountered in Europe, and theorizes that the remaining members of the cult are providing information to Arias in developing the A-virus. Both make contact with Division of Security Operations (DSO) agent Leon S. Kennedy in Colorado. Chris and Rebecca try to get a guilt-ridden Leon on board the mission, but the trio is soon attacked by Maria and Diego. They succeed in capturing Rebecca, while Chris and Leon, who finally agrees to help to finish the mission once and for all, team up to plan a rescue operation and decrypt Arias's plan of a large-scale attack on New York City.

Arias intends to make Rebecca his bride as she shares a striking resemblance to his late wife. It is also revealed here that Diego and Maria are father and daughter, and close friends of Arias who also survived the wedding massacre. Arias develops a new strain of the A-virus which resists Rebeccas' vaccine, and injects it into her. Arias then challenges Chris to rescue Rebecca within twenty minutes, after which the virus will take full effect on Rebecca. As Arias's associates initiate their attack on New York City by releasing the virus-laden gas via tankers, Leon and Chris's new BSAA team—D.C., Damian, and Nadia—manage to destroy the vehicles, contain the virus and incapacitate Maria in the process, although Damian is brutally decapitated by zombie dogs in the process. Chris, later joined by Leon, then infiltrates Arias's safe house, defeats Diego and rescues Rebecca. On the terrace, Chris engages Arias in close-quarter combat and throws Arias through the glass terrace below to his demise. Diego then arrives and, despite being badly injured after being defeated by Chris, merges with Arias to form a new Tyrant monster. Chris is no match against the Tyrant until Leon joins the fight after working his way through the safe house, mowing down zombies. With the assistance of D.C. and Nadia, they manage to trap the Tyrant, at which point Chris finishes it off with a grenade launcher. They are then able to locate the antidote that Arias kept and successfully cure Rebecca before escaping by helicopter. As the team spreads the antidote across the city to cure the rest of the infected, Leon and Chris wonder what may lie ahead.

The epilogue features Maria being alive and vowing vengeance for her father's and Arias' deaths.

Voice cast

Production
On October 15, 2015, Marza Animation Planet announced that they "decided to make a full-length CG animation movie" of Resident Evil series, which was referred to as a "reboot" and was set to be released in 2017. The title of the work-in-progress Resident Evil film was revealed as Resident Evil: Vendetta on March 25, 2016. In addition, a new promotional picture was released by Italian motorcycle manufacturer Ducati and the film studio at the 43rd Tokyo Motorcycle Show, showcasing Leon Kennedy with Ducati's newest XDiavel model motorcycle as part of an advertising agreement. In the film, Leon rides a Ducati XDiavel during the "action-packed scenes and at the climax of the movie". Capcom stated that despite being called a reboot, it is still actually just a sequel. They were actually referring to the film's new tone. The first trailer was released during the Tokyo Game Show on September 17, 2016, along with new footage of Resident Evil 7: Biohazard.

Release
To promote the film, a virtual reality experience for PlayStation VR, titled Resident Evil: Vendetta – Infected Experience, was released on May 24, 2017, for free. Resident Evil: Vendetta was released in Japanese theaters on May 27, 2017, after a premiere in Shinjuku on May 26. A limited theatrical showing in United Kingdom took place on June 14, 2017, and Fathom Events held a special one-night showing of the film across select theaters in North America on June 19, 2017. The film became available in North America across digital retailers on June 20 and on Ultra HD Blu-ray, Blu-ray and DVD on July 18. The original soundtrack composed by Kenji Kawai was released on July 7, 2017, through iTunes Store. On September 6, 2017, the film was released on Ultra HD Blu-ray, Blu-ray and DVD in Japan.

Reception

Box office 

On home video, the film earned  from DVD and Blu-ray sales in the United States.

Critical response 
On Rotten Tomatoes the film has an approval rating of 43% based on reviews from 7 critics, with an average rating of 5.40/10.

Blair Marnell of IGN gave the film 4.5 out of 10 stars and stated, "The occasionally cool-looking moments aren't enough to make up for the tedious pace and horrible script. The voice actors did the best that they could with the material, but there's no vaccine for this movie." Jordan Farley of Total Film gave the film a 2 out of 5 stars and stated, "The anime-inspired action is intermittently entertaining, but story, voice acting and animation are dead rubbish."

Jonathan Barkan of Dread Central gave it 4 out of 5 and stated, "Simply put, it's an absolute blast and I can't wait for more!". Collider gave it a B− grade, and wrote "It's worth a watch for sure, but it's also certain to be appreciated by fans of the franchise moreso than others."

Sequel 
On February 7, 2023, IGN released a teaser trailer for Resident Evil: Death Island, which will serve as a sequel to Vendetta. It is scheduled to be theatrically released in the summer of 2023.

See also
 List of films based on video games

References

External links
 
  
 
 

2017 horror films
2017 computer-animated films
Japanese adult animated films
Japanese animated horror films
Japanese animated science fiction films
Japanese computer-animated films
English-language Japanese films
2017 anime films
Resident Evil films
Horror anime and manga
Anime films based on video games
Films set in 2014
Films set in Mexico
Films set in Colorado
Films set in the 2010s
Animated films set in New York City
Films scored by Kenji Kawai